Charles Tanner may refer to:

Charles Albert Tanner (1887–1970), politician in Manitoba, Canada
Charles R. Tanner (1896–1974), American science fiction and fantasy author
Charles Kearns Deane Tanner, Member of Parliament for Mid Cork, 1885–1901
Charles Elliott Tanner (1857–1946), Canadian politician
Charles Tanner (herpetologist) (1911–1996); see Coastal taipan
Charles M. Tanner (1919–2006), screenwriter and playwright

See also
Charlie Tanner, one of the Kyle XY characters
Chuck Tanner (1928–2011), American professional baseball player and manager